Rodrig may refer to the following:

 Rodrig, the Mauritian Creole name for the island of Rodrigues
 Rodrig Goliescu (1877–1942), Romanian inventor and engineer
 Rodrig Ivanovich, a fictional character in the play Invitation to a Beheading by Vladimir Nabokov